The imperial election of 1486 was an imperial election held to select the emperor of the Holy Roman Empire.  It took place in Frankfurt on February 16.

Background 
The Holy Roman Emperor Frederick III, Holy Roman Emperor called for the election of his successor.  The prince-electors called to Frankfurt for this occasion were:

 Berthold von Henneberg, elector of Mainz
 John II of Baden, elector of Trier
 Hermann IV of Hesse, elector of Cologne
 Vladislaus II of Hungary, king of Bohemia
 Philip, Elector Palatine, elector of the Electoral Palatinate
 Ernest, Elector of Saxony, elector of Saxony
 Albrecht III Achilles, Elector of Brandenburg, elector of Brandenburg

Elected 
Frederick's son Maximilian I, Holy Roman Emperor was elected to succeed his father.

Aftermath 
Frederick died on August 19, 1493.  As per custom, Maximilian took the title King of the Romans on his father's death; the title Holy Roman Emperor was traditionally bestowed by the pope in Rome.

In 1489, Pope Innocent VIII, in conflict with Ferdinand I of Naples, king of Naples, over Ferdinand's refusal to pay feudal dues to the papacy, had excommunicated and deposed him by a papal bull of September 11.  Innocent then offered Naples to the king of France Charles VIII of France, who had a remote claim to its throne because his grandfather, Charles VII of France, had married Marie of Anjou of the House of Valois-Anjou, the ruling family of Naples at the time of their marriage in 1422.  Innocent later settled his quarrel with Ferdinand and revoked the bans before dying in 1492, but the offer to Charles remained an apple of discord in Italian politics.  Ferdinand died on January 25, 1494, and was succeeded by his son Alfonso II of Naples.

On March 16, 1494, Maximilian married Bianca Maria Sforza.  In October he granted her uncle, Ludovico Sforza, the ducal title in  Milan.  Ludovico Sforza's title was immediately challenged by Alfonso, who also had a claim to it.  To answer this threat, Ludovico Sforza invited Charles to take up Innocent's offer.  The French invasion sparked a series of conflicts, the Italian Wars, among the states in Italy which made it impossible for Maximilian to travel to Rome.  On February 4, 1508 at Trento, he claimed for himself the title of Electus Romanorum Imperator, Elected Roman Emperor, which was subsequently accepted on February 12 by Pope Julius II.  Subsequent electees retained the right to call themselves Holy Roman Emperor without being crowned by the pope.

References 

1486
1486 in the Holy Roman Empire
15th-century elections
Non-partisan elections
Maximilian I, Holy Roman Emperor
Frederick III, Holy Roman Emperor